The Pacific Rim is the land around the edge of the Pacific Ocean.

Pacific Rim may also refer to:

Arts and entertainment

 Pacific Rim (film)
 Pacific Rim (soundtrack)
 Pacific Rim (video game)

 Pacific Rim: Uprising, the film sequel
 Pacific Rim: The Black, an anime series based on the films

 Pacific Rim Tour, Whitney Houston's concert tour

Other uses
 Pacific Rim Championship, 2004 rugby competition
 Pacific Rim National Park, Canada
 Pacific Rim Mining Corporation, Canadian company
Exercise RIMPAC, international naval combat activity

See also
 Pacific (disambiguation) 
 Pacific Ring of Fire
 Ring of Fire (disambiguation)